João Tomé Esteves Baptista (born 12 February 2003), known as João Tomé, is a Portuguese professional footballer who plays as a defender for Benfica B.

Club career
João Tomé signed a contract renewal with Benfica in August 2021.

International career
He has represented Portugal at youth international level.

Career statistics

Club

Notes

Honours
Benfica
UEFA Youth League: 2021–22
Under-20 Intercontinental Cup: 2022

References

2003 births
Living people
Sportspeople from Barreiro, Portugal
Portuguese footballers
Portugal youth international footballers
Association football defenders
Liga Portugal 2 players
S.L. Benfica B players